Beat the System is a Malaysian/American pop band from Kuala Lumpur, Malaysia. Formed in Malaysia by lead guitarist Stewart Sellan, the band is currently based in New York City. The band consists of lead vocalist Shannon Gibbons, lead guitarist Stewart Sellan, drummer/composer Gerald Sellan and composer Adrian Puan. Since the band's formation, there has been several line-up changes.

The band's debut single, "Gone", was on TraXX FM charts for 10 weeks in a row and 4 weeks at number 1. Beat the System has released multiple singles, including 2009's "Penipuan Berwaris", which was also selected as the single of Warner Music Malaysia compilation album "Indiestructable:Spirit of Freedom", 2010's "Transisi" a track that was written and produced by Beat the System for Warner Music Malaysia/EMI artist Fiq for his second album 'Diagnostik', and 2012's "Shine" featuring Malaysian Idol winner Jaclyn Victor.
 
In response to their single "Shine", Beat the System won the Song of the Year Award, Best Collaboration Award and Best Genre Bender Award at the 2012 Asian Voice Independent Music Awards featuring bands all over Asia.

In 2010, Beat the System was certified with Tipped to Be the Next Big Thing by the Asian Voice Independent Awards committee.

Diana Meltzer discovered and arranged their move to the US.

History

In 2005, lead guitarist Stewart Sellan met Rage at a church in Johor Bahru and started writing songs. The duo realized that they needed a bassist to perform and Sam Seelan was introduced to the band by Rage. It was when Stewart Sellan decided to move to Kuala Lumpur, that he realized his brother Gerald Sellan was a drummer and offered him to join the band. Gerald Sellan was appointed as the band leader after a couple of years and the band was directed towards a newer sound.

After the departure of Rage, Gerald Sellan and Adrian Puan were appointed to be songwriters for the band.

After composing 10 brand new tracks, the band recorded a 30-minute EP and begins to shop for label in the US in which it caught the attention of Diana Meltzer of Monster Hits Music.

Diana Meltzer, upon hearing the Beat the System EP, flew to Malaysia and started developing the band. In December 2014 the band was relocated to New York to work on their debut album, Journey, with producer Andy Anderson, Grammy Awards nominated engineer Damien Page Lewis and mastering engineer Chris Athens. The band also acquired a new lead singer, May Leigh. After her departure in 2019, she was later replaced by Shannon Gibbons, a former American Idol contestant.

Band members

Current members
Gerald Sellan – songwriter, drums (2008–present)
Stewart Sellan – electric guitar, acoustic guitar (2005–present)
Shannon Gibbons – lead vocalist (2020–present)
Adrian Puan – songwriter (2011–present)

Former members
 May Leigh – lead vocalist (2015–2019)

Touring musicians
Mario Leong – keyboards, electric guitar, acoustic guitar (2011–present)

Discography

Extended plays

Compilation appearances

Singles

Awards and nominations 
Asian Voice Independent Music Awards

Asian Bite My Music Global Awards

References

2005 establishments in Malaysia
American pop rock music groups
American post-grunge musical groups
Musical groups established in 2005
Musical quartets
Alternative rock groups from New York (state)
Hard rock musical groups from New York (state)
Malaysian rock music groups
Malaysian pop rock music groups
Malaysian post-grunge groups